Suraju Saka (born 5 May 1976, in Nigeria) is a Nigerian table tennis player. He competed at the 2012 Summer Olympics in the Men's singles, but was defeated in the first round.  He also went out in the first round at the 2008 Summer Olympics.

Suraju is distinct on the African Table Tennis Scene as the only Male Singles player since 1968 to win the African Table Tennis Championships not representing either Egypt or Nigeria, having won the 2008 Championships representing Republic of the Congo.

References

External links
 

Republic of the Congo table tennis players
1976 births
Living people
Olympic table tennis players of the Republic of Congo
Table tennis players at the 2008 Summer Olympics
Table tennis players at the 2012 Summer Olympics
Table tennis players at the 2016 Summer Olympics
African Games silver medalists for the Republic of the Congo
African Games medalists in table tennis
African Games bronze medalists for the Republic of the Congo
Competitors at the 2011 All-Africa Games
Competitors at the 2015 African Games
Commonwealth Games medallists in table tennis
Commonwealth Games silver medallists for Nigeria
Table tennis players at the 2002 Commonwealth Games
Nigerian male table tennis players
Medallists at the 2002 Commonwealth Games